Prince William Charles Christian of Saxe-Gotha-Altenburg (German: Wilhelm Carl Christian von Sachsen-Gotha-Altenburg; 12 March 1701, Gotha – 31 May 1771, Tonna) was a German prince of the Saxe-Gotha-Altenburg house, a junior line of the Ernestine Wettins. He served as a Generalfeldzeugmeister in the armies of the Holy Roman Empire.

Family
He was the second surviving son of Frederick II, Duke of Saxe-Gotha-Altenburg (1676–1732) and his wife Magdalena Augusta (1679–1740), daughter of Charles, Prince of Anhalt-Zerbst. On 17 May 1750 he was one of three godparents to Prince Frederick of Great Britain, youngest son of William's younger sister Augusta and Frederick, Prince of Wales – the other two godparents were the child's elder siblings Augusta and George.

Military career
In 1734 he became Generalwachtmeister in the forces of Charles VI, Holy Roman Emperor, commanding the same two regiments that his elder brother Frederick III, Duke of Saxe-Gotha-Altenburg had led against the French. In 1738 he became a Generalfeldmarschallleutnant and in 1750 a Generalfeldzeugmeister. He made two failed petitions to rise to Reichsgeneralfeldmarschall in 1753 and 1760 and soon afterwards resigned as a Generalfeldzeugmeister to take up residence in Tonna.

Marriage
In Hamburg on 8 November 1742 he married Anna (1709–1758), daughter of Christian August of Holstein-Gottorp, Prince of Eutin and aunt of Catherine II of Russia. They had no children.

Bibliography
  Johann Georg August Galletti: Geschichte und Beschreibung des Herzogthums Gotha, Gotha, 1779, S. 354

People from Gotha (town)
1701 births
1771 deaths
William
Generals of the Holy Roman Empire
Sons of monarchs